Province of Montreal may refer to:

 The Roman Catholic ecclesiastical province of Montreal, see List of Roman Catholic dioceses in North America
 The Proposal for the Province of Montreal
 a misnomer from the 19th century for the province of Quebec
 a misnomer for the district of Montreal in the colony of Canada during the French colonial period